Carla Abellan (31 July 1997 Terrassa) is a Spanish water polo player, who played for CN Sabadell.

She participated in the  2013 Women's LEN Super Cup, 2014 Women's LEN Super Cup, 2014–15 LEN Euro League Women, and 2014 European U19 Women's Championships.

She plays for University of Hawaii.

References

External links 

 https://swimswam.com/tag/carla-abellan/
 https://calbears.com/news/2019/3/29/womens-water-polo-no-4-bears-edged-by-no-5-hawai-i.aspx

1997 births
Spanish female water polo players
Living people
21st-century Spanish women